Native American Heritage Day is a civil holiday observed on the day after Thanksgiving in the United States.

National legislative history 
President George W. Bush signed into law legislation introduced by Congressman Joe Baca (D-Calif.), to designate the Friday after Thanksgiving as Native American Heritage Day. The Native American Heritage Day Bill was supported by the National Indian Gaming Association (NIGA) and 184 federally recognized tribes, and designates Friday, November 28, 2008, as a day to pay tribute to Native Americans for their many contributions to the United States.

The Native American Heritage Day Bill encourages Americans of all backgrounds to observe the day after Thanksgiving as Native American Heritage Day, through appropriate ceremonies and activities. It also encourages public elementary and secondary schools to enhance student understanding of Native Americans by providing classroom instructions focusing on their history, achievements, and contributions.

The United States House of Representatives originally passed H.J. Res. 62 on November 13, 2007. The bill was passed with technical adjustments by unanimous consent in the United States Senate on September 22, 2008. Then, on September 26, 2008, the House of Representatives unanimously voted to pass the legislation again, this time including the adjustments from the Senate. The legislation was signed into public law by the President on October 8, 2008.

Some individual states have also taken legislative action to recognize this day. For example, Maryland established this day in 2008 under the name American Indian Heritage Day. Further, the State House of Washington approved this measure in 2013.

Criticism 

In addition to calling Thanksgiving the "National Day of Mourning," some Native Americans believe it is "poor taste" for Native American Heritage Day to be on Black Friday—"a day of excess and gluttony and greed and aggressive capitalism"—which itself "falls after a holiday that omits the murder and mutilation of Natives mourn the millions of indigenous people who died as a result of aggressive settler colonialism."

See also 
 Columbus Day
 Indigenous People's Day
 Native American Day
 Native American Indian Heritage Month
 Opposition to Columbus celebrations
 Brazilian Native American Day

References 

November observances
Public holidays in the United States
Indigenous peoples days
Observances based on the date of Thanksgiving (United States)
Native American people